The role of women in the Enlightenment is debated. It is acknowledged that women during this era were not considered of equal status to men, and much of their work and effort were suppressed. Even so, salons, coffeehouses, debating societies, academic competitions and print all became avenues for women to socialize, learn and discuss enlightenment ideas. For many women, these avenues furthered their roles in society and created stepping stones for future progress.

The Enlightenment came to advance ideals of liberty, progress, and tolerance. For those women who were able to discuss and advance new ideals, discourse on religion, political and social equality, and sexuality became prominent topics in the salons, debating societies, and in print. While women in England and France gained arguably more freedom than their counterparts in other countries, the role of women in the Enlightenment was typically reserved for those of middle and also the upper-class families, were then allowed and able to access money to join societies and the education to participate in debate. Therefore, the women in the Enlightenment only represented a small class of society and not the entire female sex.

Significant people and publications 
The role of women in society became a topic of discussion during the Enlightenment. Influential philosophers and thinkers such as John Locke, David Hume, Adam Smith, Nicolas de Condorcet, and Jean-Jacques Rousseau debated matters of gender equality. Prior to the Enlightenment, women were not considered of equal status to men in Western society. For example, Rousseau believed that women were subordinate to men and women should obey men. Challenging the popular inequality, Locke believed that the notion that men are superior to women was created by man. Condorcet also challenged the existing gender inequality by advocating for female political equality. Authors cited Queen Elizabeth, Empress Catherine of Russia, and Queen Maria Theresa of Austria as powerful women who were capable of intellect. In recent years the relationship between religion and Enlightenment, e.g. in the Catholic Enlightenment, in the works and lives of women writers has come to the attention of historians.

Prolific Enlightenment women philosophers and historians included Mary Wollstonecraft, Olympe de Gouges, Catherine Macaulay, Mary Astell, Mary Chudleigh, and Louise d’Épinay. Macaulay's influential The Letters on Education (1790) advocated for the education of women. Wollstonecraft's A Vindication of the Rights of Woman (1792) used similar arguments, stating that women ought to have education commensurate with their position in society. Women's access to education gave rise to the potential to hasten the progress of society. De Gouges published the Declaration of the Rights of Woman and the Female Citizen (1791) as a testament to the political inequality of women and to challenge male authority in society.

Salons

Salons were a forum in which elite, well-educated women could continue their learning in a place of civil conversation, while governing the political discourse and a place where people of all social orders could interact.

In the 18th century, under the guidance of Madame Geoffrin, Mademoiselle de Lespinasse, and Madame Necker, the salon was transformed from a venue of leisure into a place of enlightenment. In the salon, there was no formal class or education barrier to prevent attendees from participating in open discussion. Throughout the 18th century the salon served as a matrix for Enlightenment ideals. Women were important in this capacity because they took on the role of salonnieres.

Salons of France were assembled by a small number of elite women who were concerned with education and promoting philosophies of the Enlightenment. Salons were hosted in a private home or a hotel dining room. There was a meal, and discourse took place afterwards. During the meal, the focus would be on the discourse between patrons rather than the dining.

The salons had a hierarchical social structure where social ranks were upheld but under different rules of conversation designed to limit misunderstandings and conflict. Participants were often people from different societal ranks, allowing the commoners to interact with people with a higher status. Many people used fashionable opinions to move up social ladders.

Within the hierarchy of the salons, women assumed a role of governance. Initially an institution of recreation, salons became an active institution of Enlightenment. Suzanne Necker, wife to Louis XVI's financial minister, provides an example of how the salons' topics may have had a bearing on official government policy.

Some believe that the salons actually reinforced or only made the gender and societal differences bearable. The salons allowed people of varying social classes to converse but never as equals. Women in salons were active in ways similar to women in traditional court society as protectorates, or socially active as their presence is said to encourage civil activity and politeness. Additionally, salons were often not used for educational purposes, rather as a way to socialize and entertain.

Coffeehouses

A coffeehouse was a place where English virtuosi would gather to converse and educate in a civilized setting. People of all levels of knowledge gathered to share and debate information and interests. Coffeehouses brought people together to learn, but they were not associated with any university or institution. As informal practices of education, coffeehouses were often condemned and deemed improper by male scholars who were accustomed to completely male-dominated institutions.

Coffeehouses is where most all women were involved, like the one run by Moll King, were said to degrade traditional, virtuosic, male-run coffeehouses. King's fashionable coffeehouse operated into late hours of the night and catered to clientele very different from the virtuosi. Her coffeehouse shows that Enlightenment women were not always simply the timid gender, governors of polite conversation, or protectorates of aspiring artists.

Debating societies 
Debating societies were popular gatherings that included both education and recreation through state and social affairs. A hall was rented and attendees were charged an admission fee to discuss various topics in the public sphere. Debating societies were initially male-dominated, but they developed into mixed-gender organizations and women-only events. Unlike in salons, women were able to participate as equals, not as governors or protectors.

Debating societies, which prior to the Enlightenment were exclusively male, gained popularity in London in the 1750s. Women in England entered the conversation on Enlightenment ideals by joining the debating societies. Anyone who paid an admission fee would be able to enter and speak. Financial status was a barrier to some in the lower classes, but admission of women into debating societies opened up political and social discourse to a larger portion of society. The societies were the only outlet for lower and middle class individuals to express unorthodox views of the time. The women's only debating societies brought to public notice the burgeoning demand for equal education, equal political rights, and the protection of women's occupations. Women's attendance at debating societies was seen as an incursion on male space and drew considerable criticism. This criticism was a driver for the creation of women's only debating societies.

At the end of 1780, there were four known women-only debating societies: La Belle Assemblee, the Female Parliament, the Carlisle House Debates for Ladies only, and the Female Congress. The topics often dealt with questions of male and female relations, marriage, courtship, and whether women should be allowed to partake in the political culture.

Though women were asked to partake in debating societies, there were stipulations as to which societies they could be a part of and when they were permitted to attend. Women were only allowed to participate when no  alcohol was present. Although women attended and participated in debating societies, they were often accused of not holding valid arguments and acting simply as puppets.

Print
Women were more involved in publishing their writings than previously thought. In order to publish work during most of the Enlightenment, a married woman had to have written consent from her husband. As the Old Regime began to fail, women became more prolific in their publications. Publishers were no longer concerned about a husband's consent, and a more commercial attitude was adopted, publishing books that were going to sell. With the new economic outlook of the Enlightenment, female writers were granted more opportunity in the print sphere.

The opening up of the publishing world made it easier for women to make a living off of the profession. Writing was an ideal occupation as it was mentally fulfilling, could be done anywhere and was adaptable to life's circumstances. Many women who wrote did not depend on the money and often wrote for charities. Topics they chose often defied the gender roles of the day as there were few boundaries of self-expression.

Print culture became far more accessible to women in the 18th century. Through the production of cheap editions and through the expanding amount of books targeted toward a female readership, women were more able to access education. Prior to the 18th century, many women gained knowledge from correspondence with males because books were not as accessible to them. Social circles emerged around printed books. While the reading habits of men revolved around silent study, women used reading as a social activity. Reading books in intimate gatherings became a mode that fostered discourse among women.

Academic competitions 
Some historians, such as Pieretti and John Iverson, say participation of women in academic competitions peaked during the time of King Louis XIV and slowly tapered off. Others, like Robert Darnton, fail to mention them at all. Jeremy Caradonna presents evidence to the contrary, showing that 49 of the over 2000 prize competitions were won by women. This number is a little misleading, however, because many of the women won on more than one occasion. The idea that women only won because the prize competitions were completely anonymous is dispelled by Caradonna as well.

Questions shifted from men-centric interests to questions regarding women's rights and education, encouraging female participation. The Academy of Besançon was one to receive many female entries during the two years the competition was open. One of the members of the Academy released a pamphlet reprimanding misogynist opinions. Though there were many women who participated, only winning a prize competition ensured publication.

References

Age of Enlightenment
18th-century women